Wankaner Junction railway station is located in Wankaner city of Morbi district, Gujarat. It is under  division of Western Railway. Its code is WKR. It has four platforms. Passenger, DEMU, Express, and Superfast trains halt here.

History
The Morvi-Wankaner section was laid as a 2 ft 6inch road side tram way in the year 1890 by Morvi Railway under the regime of Sir Waghji Thakor. Wadhwan–ajkot metre-auge section of Morvi State Railway laid in the year 1890. Rajkot–Wadhwan section was completed in the year 1905 by Morvi State Railway. Later Morvi–ankaner section was converted to mtre gauge in 1924 to match rail lines of other state.

Railway reorganization
Morvi State Railway was merged into the Western Railway on 5 November 1951. It was the last Steam engine hauled section in India in the year 2000. Before railbuses took over on Wankaner–Morvi, there were two-coach trains hauled by YG or YP steam locos (these were
the last steam-hauled trains on those routes). Wankaner–Maliya Miyana section Conversion to broad gauge was completed in the year 2001.

Trains

The following trains halt at Wankaner Junction railway station in both directions:

 22991/92 Bandra Terminus–Veraval Superfast Express
 22939/40 Hapa–Bilaspur Superfast Express
 22957/58 Somnath Superfast Express
 19215/16 Saurashtra Express
 15045/46 Gorakhpur–Okha Express
 19217/18 Bandra Terminus–Jamnagar Saurashtra Janta Express
 16733/34 Rameswaram–Okha Express
 19263/64 Porbandar–Delhi Sarai Rohilla Express
 17017/18 Rajkot–Secunderabad Express
 22959/60 Surat–Jamnagar Intercity Express
 22961/62 Surat–Hapa Intercity Express
 12475/76 Hapa–Shri Mata Vaishno Devi Katra Sarvodaya Express
 12477/78 Jamnagar–Shri Mata Vaishno Devi Katra Express
 22945/46 Saurashtra Mail
 16333/34 Thiruvananthapuram–Veraval Express
 19579/80 Rajkot–Delhi Sarai Rohilla Weekly Express
 22951/52 Bandra Terminus–Gandhidham Weekly Superfast Express
 19269/70 Porbandar–Muzaffarpur Express
 11087/88 Veraval–Pune Express
 11465/66 Somnath–Jabalpur Express (via Bina)
 11463/64 Somnath–Jabalpur Express (via Itarsi)
 19119/20 Ahmedabad–Somnath Intercity Express
 19319/20 Veraval–Indore Mahamana Express
 19575/76 Okha–Nathdwara Express
 22937/38 Rajkot–Rewa Superfast Express
 15667/68 Kamakhya–Gandhidham Express
 22923/24 Bandra Terminus–Jamnagar Humsafar Express

Wankaner–Morbi DEMU and Wankaner–Rajkot DEMU start from here.

References

Railway stations in Rajkot district
Rajkot railway division
Railway junction stations in Gujarat